Helmut Böck may refer to:

 Helmut Böck (diplomat), Austrian diplomat
 Helmut Böck (skier) (born 1931), German Nordic skier